Trevor is a village in Wrexham County Borough, Wales. It is situated in the scenic Vale of Llangollen, on the A539 between Llangollen and Wrexham, in the community of Llangollen Rural, and in the historic county of Denbighshire.

Its name is an anglicised version of the Welsh place-name Trefor, meaning "large village". This was one of the old townships of the parish of Llangollen, giving its name to both a powerful landowning family whose ancestral home was in the township, and to the later industrial settlement represented by the modern village. In common with neighbouring Froncysyllte, Trevor is largely made up of nineteenth- and twentieth-century cottages for workers in the area's traditional industries of limestone quarrying and brick-making. Although these industries have now disappeared the area has a rich industrial archeology.

Trevor lies on the Llangollen Canal at the northern end of the Pontcysyllte Aqueduct: the Trevor Basin is at the north end of the aqueduct.

Until 1965, the village had a railway station on the now-closed Ruabon–Barmouth line. However the nearby Llangollen Railway aims to extend eastwards to Ruabon, which may include rebuilding and full restoration of the station as part of the work.

The Offa's Dyke Path passes through the village.

See also
 Trevor Hall - grade I listed country house

References

Villages in Wrexham County Borough